The Brokenwood Mysteries is a New Zealand television detective drama series that premiered on Prime in 2014. Each of the first six series comprises four distinct episodes. Series 7 began streaming on 29 March 2021 on Acorn TV, comprises six episodes. The programme is set in the fictitious New Zealand town of Brokenwood and is filmed in the greater Auckland region. Tim Balme conceived the series and is lead writer with Philip Dalkin, James Griffin, and Greg McGee.

The cast includes Neill Rea as Detective Senior Sergeant Mike Shepherd, Fern Sutherland as Detective Kristin Sims, Nic Sampson as Detective Constable Sam Breen, Cristina Ionda as Dr. Gina Kadinsky, medical examiner, Jarod Rawiri as Detective Constable Daniel Chalmers, and Pana Hema Taylor as Jared Morehu, Shepherd's Māori neighbour.

On 27 February 2022, via Twitter, the production company, South Pacific Pictures, announced that the eighth series had completed production. Series 8 was aired from 1 July to 1 August 2022.

Synopsis
Detective Inspector Mike Shepherd is sent from Auckland to Brokenwood to investigate a local police officer. With a possible murder investigation underway that might link the two, Shepherd takes charge. After the investigation, Shepherd reassesses his life and decides to stay on indefinitely, even though it means a demotion to Detective Senior Sergeant. Brokenwood is a seemingly quiet country town where Shepherd, who has an unconventional approach to police work, is assisted by local Detective Kristin Sims, who is precise and efficient at her job, to solve murders. As the series progresses, the working relationship between the two moves from rocky to functional as they begin to appreciate each other's talents.

Setting
It is in a farming area, with crops ranging from wheat to local wine, and the surrounding area is home to many people who have escaped city life (from retirees to alternative lifestylers). Though the exact location of Brokenwood is not stated, it was largely written and filmed in small towns immediately to the north of Auckland. The real-life town of Warkworth doubles as Brokenwood, and the Brokenwood Police Station is a 1911 building that was the Helensville Post Office. In "Sour Grapes", Shepherd and Sims are seen travelling into Auckland across the Auckland Harbour Bridge, which would confirm that Brokenwood is also located to the north of the city. In the same episode, it is mentioned that it takes two and a half hours by road to get from Brokenwood to Auckland. This would put Brokenwood considerably farther north than either Warkworth or Helensville. A map on the police station wall covers much of Whangarei District, from southern Bream Bay north to Matapouri, and another map shown in "Catch of the Day" locates Brokenwood close to the settlement of Whangarei Heads, at the northern end of Bream Bay.

Cast

Main
 Neill Rea as Detective Senior Sergeant Mike Shepherd: a detective who decided to settle down in Brokenwood for a more peaceful life. He has many personal secrets, including several marriages, a nephew with Down Syndrome, and a love for country music and his Holden Kingswood classic car. He often pursues criminals in a way that seems odd to his colleagues.
 Fern Sutherland as Detective Kristin Sims: a cynical and intelligent young woman who has had many dating misfortunes. She is often irritated by Shepherd's methods and his blunt manner, but she gradually learns to appreciate his skills.
 Nic Sampson as Detective Constable Sam Breen (series 1-7): a young officer who often has embarrassing or awkward visits with suspects. His girlfriend Roxy gets a new job in the Solomon Islands and Breen moves away in the beginning of series 7.
 Jarod Rawiri as Detective Constable Daniel Chalmers (series 7-present): Chalmers replaces Breen after Breen moves to the Solomon Islands.
 Cristina Ionda as Dr. Gina Kadinsky, the medical examiner. She is a highly eccentric Russian woman who often talks about how things were in Russia and doesn't quite understand "the English humour". She drops frequent hints that she is attracted to Shepherd, an attraction that is not reciprocated.
 Rawiri Jobe as Kahu Taylor (series 4–5): Jared's cousin (or rather, Jared is his "brother's cousin", invariably provoking the question "how does that work?"). He's a self-employed plumber.

Recurring
 Elizabeth McRae as Mrs. Jean Marlowe (series 2–7): a kindly older woman who often engages in gossip after a murder.
 Pana Hema Taylor as Jared Morehu (series 1–3; guest series 5; series 6): Shepherd's Māori neighbour. As a local who has many friends and interests, he often finds himself involved in murder investigations.
 Colin Moy as Simon Hughes: area police commander and close friend of DSS Shepherd.
 Karl Willetts as Frankie "Frodo" Oades: a former mechanic who later starts his own coffee/food truck.
 Jason Hoyte as Ray Neilson (series 2–present): the proprietor of a local pub The Frog and Cheetah, and the co-owner of the "Lord of the Ringz" tours.
 Tracy Lee Gray as Trudy Neilson (series 3-4, 6-present): Ray Neilson's sister, co-proprietor of the Frog and Cheetah and one-time resident of the Brokenwood Women's Prison.
 Shane Cortese as Dennis Buchanan (series 2–present): a defence lawyer who often crosses swords with the police.
 Zara Cormack as Kimberly Mason, Frodo's girlfriend. 
 Roy Ward as Reverend Lucas Greene (series 2–3, 5-present): a local Anglican priest who thinks well of others out of Christian charity.
 Phil Peleton as Neil Bloom (series 1-present): a local pharmacist who later becomes the first gay mayor of Brokenwood.

Guests
Several well-known New Zealand actors have appeared in episodes of The Brokenwood Mysteries, among them:
Ben Barrington ("Leather & Lace")
Amanda Billing ("Over Her Dead Body")
Ken Blackburn ("Catch of the Day", "The Killing Machine", and "As If Nothing Had Happened")
Alison Bruce ("The Dark Angel")
Lisa Chappell ("Good as Gold")
Shane Cortese ("Catch of the Day" and "A Merry Bloody Christmas")
Josephine Davison ("Sour Grapes")
Stuart Devenie ("As If Nothing Had Happened")
Mike Edward ("Blood and Water" and "The Scarecrow")
Peter Elliott ("Sour Grapes")
David Fane ("The Killing Machine")
J.J. Fong ("Over Her Dead Body")
Mark Hadlow ("The Garotte and the Vinkelbraun")
Miranda Harcourt ("To Die or Not to Die")
Peter Hayden ("A Merry Bloody Christmas")
Theresa Healey ("Over Her Dead Body")
Laura Hill ("Over Her Dead Body" and "The Killing Machine")
Chris Hobbs ("The Killing Machine")
Xavier Horan ("Leather & Lace")
Nicola Kawana ("Over Her Dead Body" and "A Merry Bloody Christmas")
Robyn Malcolm ("To Die or Not to Die")
Ian Mune ("As If Nothing Had Happened")
Miriama McDowell ("Blood and Water" and "Hunting the Stag")
Jacqueline Nairn ("Stone Cold Dead")
Rachel Nash ("Scared to Death")
Dean O'Gorman ("The Dark Angel")
Ingrid Park ("Catch of the Day", "As If Nothing Had Happened" and "Tontine")
Bree Peters ("Three Coins in a Fountain")
Donogh Rees ("Playing the Lie")
Jodie Rimmer ("Leather & Lace", "To Die or Not to Die" and "Blood Pink")
Ilona Rodgers ("Tontine")
Emmett Skilton ("The Black Widower")
Esther Stephens ("Fall From Grace")
Olivia Tennet ("Scared to Death")
Roz Turnbull ("Playing the Lie")
Calvin Tuteao ("Playing the Lie")
Jared Turner ("Hunting the Stag")
Bronwyn Turei ("Blood Pink")
Aidee Walker ("The Dark Angel")
Catherine Wilkin ("As If Nothing Had Happened")
Katie Wolfe ("The Black Widower")
Tandi Wright ("The Dark Angel")
Sara Wiseman ("Here's to You, Mrs. Robinson")

Casting Changes

Nic Sampson, the actor who played Breen, left the show to move back to the United Kingdom.  His character was replaced by D.C. Chalmers (played by Jarod Rawiri). who was introduced in series 7 episode 2.

Episodes

Series overview

Series 1 (2014)

Series 2 (2015)

Series 3 (2016)

Series 4 (2017)

Series 5 (2018)

Series 6 (2019)

Series 7 (2021)

Series 8 (2022) 
Episode one aired on Friday, 1 July with all the following episodes airing on the Mondays following (4 July, etc).

Ratings

Series 1

Series 2

International
 In France the series is shown on France 3 with a viewer average of 3.4 million each episode and has been retitled Brokenwood.
 The series has also been shown in Denmark, the United States, Australia and Italy.
 The series premiered in Australia on 13th Street on 27 January 2016. It is also shown on the 9Gem channel.
 The series premiered in the United States and Canada on Acorn TV the same day as New Zealand as one of the US co-producers and broadcasters. The series also airs on television on several PBS stations. The series later premiered on Ovation (American TV channel) on 28 June 2021.
 The series started being shown in the United Kingdom and Ireland on the Drama Channel in February 2017.
 The series were shown in Bulgaria by Fox Crime Bulgaria in March 2017.
 The series is shown in Finland by YLE in 2017–2018.
 The series premiered in Italy on Giallo on 16 April 2016 titled I misteri di Brokenwood.
 The series premiered in Germany on Das Erste on 21 July 2019 titled Brokenwood - Mord in Neuseeland.
The series premiered in Belgium on één, on 8 May 2020.
The series has also been shown in Czech TV Prima titled Vraždy v Brokenwoodu.

Reception and awards
Critical response to the series has been mixed, with many reviewers impressed by the plots but lamenting the occasionally hokey dialogue. The two-hour length (broadcast length with ads) of episodes has also been mentioned by some as too long for such a series.

Writing in the New Zealand Herald, critic Colin Hogg panned the series, stating that it was "a local version aiming at that grand TV detective tradition" but that its "Dialogue is clichéd, the acting aches and the locations are boring." International television website "The Medium is Not Enough" was also generally negative in its review, describing the series as a "genteel, New Zealand drama designed to appeal to perhaps an older demographic that likes comfortable murder-mysteries and to New Zealanders eager to watch anything that’s actually set in New Zealand and stars New Zealanders."

Christine Tidball, writing for the entertainment website Cheese on Toast was kinder, rating the series "charming, without being cloying, very well-written (thanks to Tim Balme) and funny, but not too funny [...] It’s also engaging, full of twists, and will keep you guessing right till the end."

As the series has progressed, reviews have become more positive. DVD review website High Def Standard described the first series as "uniquely thrilling TV" and "a New Zealand Midsomer Murders that isn’t afraid to venture off into Twin Peaks territory every now and again." The Manawatu Standard'''s Malcolm Hopwood enjoyed the series but lamented episode length: "The Brokenwood Mysteries (Prime Sundays) is like our TPP negotiations. They are long, energy-sapping but satisfying if you're still awake after two hours." He added that the series was "intriguing, confusing and exhausting", and that it "deserves our support but it needs to be recorded and watched in small chunks." Michael Reuben, writing for blu-ray.com, rated series one at 4 stars out of 5.The Brokenwood Mysteries received a bronze world medal at the New York Festival's International Television and Film Awards in 2014.The Brokenwood Mysteries'' received a silver world medal at the New York Festival's International Television and Film Awards in 2018.

Cars
Shepherd's car is a 1971 Holden Kingswood (HG series). It has a cassette player for his country music cassettes.

Music
Brokenwood Mysteries showcases New Zealand's own country and alternative rock music. In the first season, Shepherd is introduced as a fan of country and western music, sharing the music with Sims while driving around in his car. The music he listens to and the background music of the show are all New Zealand performers.  Season two, which climaxed with the death of country singer Holly Collins, was scored by Canadian-born Kiwi-based Tami Neilson and her brother Jay Neilson.  Three volumes of soundtracks covering season 1, 2, and 6 of the show have been released digitally on Apple Music, Amazon and Spotify.

New Zealand musicians exhibited on Brokenwood include Tami Neilson, Mel Parsons, Delaney Davidson, Barry Saunders, the Harbour Union, Barnaby Weir of the Black Seeds, the Unfaithful Way, and Jenny Mitchell. Other singers are Marlon Williams, the Warratahs, Bannerman, the Desotos, Aldous Harding, Jackie Bristow, The Fables, Ghost Town, Reb Fountain, The Eastern, and Esther Stephens.

Home releases

References

External links 
 
  at South Pacific Pictures
 

2010s New Zealand television series
2020s New Zealand television series
2014 New Zealand television series debuts
Detective television series
English-language television shows
New Zealand drama television series
New Zealand mystery television series
Police procedural television series
Prime (New Zealand TV channel) original programming
Television series by All3Media
Television series by South Pacific Pictures
Television shows filmed in New Zealand
Television shows funded by NZ on Air
Television shows set in New Zealand
TVNZ 1 original programming